Qubeh (also Romanized as Qūbeh; also known as Qabeh) is a village in Lahijan-e Gharbi Rural District, Lajan District, Piranshahr County, West Azerbaijan Province, Iran. At the 2006 census, its population was 261, in 38 families.

References 

Populated places in Piranshahr County